Pacho Galán (1906—1988) was a Colombian composer and band leader of several Colombian music forms. His songs include Boquita Sala, Rio Y Mar, Fiesta de Cumbia, Cumbia Alegre and Ay Cosita Linda, which became one of his most famous after Nat King Cole recorded his own rendition of the song.

External links
 Pacho Galán's Orchestra — Pacho Galán's Orchestra Official Website

1906 births
1988 deaths
Colombian musicians